Herbert Herff (October 18, 1891  – December 27, 1969) was an American businessman and philanthropist.

A civic and business leader in Memphis, Tennessee, in 1938 Herbert Herff raised the funds to establish the first blood bank in the U.S. South and only the fourth such facility in the entire country. Years later, Herff's foundation was the first in Memphis to provide funding for sickle cell anemia. In 1964 he and his wife, Minnie G. Herff (1899-1988), donated the money to establish the Herff College of Engineering at the University of Memphis. When he died in 1966, Herbert Herff left the bulk of his estate in trust with the State of Tennessee for the benefit of the University. More than forty years later, the Trust continues to help sustain and expand University programs. Among them are the:
 Herbert Herff Professor of Biomedical Engineering
 Herbert Herff Chair of Excellence in Law – Cecil C. Humphreys School of Law 
 Herbert Herff Presidential Law Scholarships 
 Herbert Herff Registration Loan Program - established to provide short-term loan assistance to students who have no means of paying their registration fees.
 Herbert Herff Book Loan Program

Herbert Herff was an owner of Thoroughbred racehorses. Notably, he and his wife raced the colt Tudor Era who in 1959 won the Long Island Handicap, Man o' War Stakes, and the Longfellow Handicap.

He died at a hospital in Palm Beach, Florida, where he had a winter home.

References

Sources
 Story involving Herbert Herff reproduced from TABB News Vol. 3(2), Autumn 1977
 Herff College of Engineering at the University of Memphis

1891 births
1966 deaths
20th-century American businesspeople
American racehorse owners and breeders
Jewish American philanthropists
People from Memphis, Tennessee
University of Memphis people
People from Wabash, Indiana
20th-century American philanthropists
20th-century American Jews